The Huasna River is a stream in the Central Coast region of California, and is a tributary of the Cuyama River. It is formed by the confluence of Trout Creek and Stony Creek, which originate along the crest of the Santa Lucia Range in the Los Padres National Forest. It flows south, past the community of Huasna and the Huasna Valley before reaching Twitchell Reservoir, which is created by a dam along the Cuyama River.

Like most other streams in this part of California, the Huasna River is usually dry, with significant flows only during the winter and early spring. During rare high water levels of Twitchell Reservoir, the lower part of the Huasna Valley may be flooded.

See also
List of rivers of California

References

Rivers of Southern California
Rivers of San Luis Obispo County, California